Joshua Harvey, otherwise known as Hervé , is a producer/DJ from the UK. Hervé is known for bass-orientated as well as eclectic productions and DJ sets. He also runs the label Cheap Thrills, which has released music by Fake Blood, Jack Beats, Lone and Project Bassline, amongst others.

Career
In 2001, together with SEBA, Joshua (then Josh) produced the song "Diamond" for the film Snatch along with an album under the name Klint.

Along with Sinden and Kid Sister, his track "Beeper" reached number 1 on the UK Dance Chart in July 2008. Hervé and Sinden released their album Mega Mega Mega under the name the Count & Sinden in 2010 on Domino Records. The album received great reviews across the board from the likes of Mixmag, The Guardian and Clash. Their summer single "After Dark" which featured the Mystery Jets was on the Radio 1 playlist and saw them play live at Reading Festival with the band. Other guests on the album included Katy B, Bashy and Rye Rye.

He has released two compilations Ghetto Bass and Ghetto Bass 2, both are 2 CD mixes of "bassline sounds, electro, drum & bass, dubstep & house" tracks by a variety of artists.

In 2010, Hervé collaborated with Fatboy Slim to produce the acid house song "Machines Can Do the Work".

His 2012 album Pick Me Up, Sort Me Out, Calm Me Down features guests including Steve Mason of the Beta Band.

Hervé is founder of the collaborative group Machines Don't Care which has seen tracks with guests such as Sinden, Trevor Loveys, Affie Yusuf, Toddla T, Fake Blood, Detboi & Drop the Lime.

In 2013, Hervé released the album The Art of Disappearing featuring guests Austra, Niki & the Dove, Maria Minerva and Seasfire.

He has also produced an album by the band Closer, an indie/electronic/balearic/dance band from London. The first EP was released in May 2014.

In June 2014, he released the instrumental album Nothing Left of Us as Klint.

In 2016, he released his double album Hallucinated Surf featuring Meridian Dan, Zebra Katz, Steve Mason, Kelly Lee Owens and others on Skint/BMG.

Discography

Albums
Ghetto Bass (2009)
Ghetto Bass 2 (2010)
Pick Me Up, Sort Me Out, Calm Me Down (2012)
The Art of Disappearing (2013)
Nothing Left of Us (2014)
Hallucinated Surf (2016)

EPs
Blaze It (2010)

Singles
"Cheap Thrills" (featuring Plastic Little & Ny) (2008)
"Rikkalicious" (with Kissy Sell Out) (2009) - UK #84
"Together" (2011) - UK #142
"Better Than a BMX" (2012)
"How Can I Live Without You (Make It Right)" (featuring Ronika) (2012)
"Night Turns into Day" (2012)
"Zombies 2 (Return of the Living Dead)" (2012)
 "Save Me" (featuring Austra) (2013)
 "Gold" (featuring Maria Minerva) (2013)
 "Lose Control" (featuring Seasfire) (2013)
 "Lose Control" (featuring Seasfire) {Taiki & Nulight Remix} (2013)
 "Power of Bass" (with Armand Van Helden) (2014)
 "Tear the House Up" (featuring Zebra Katz) (2014)

Remixes
"Mars (Hervé Re-Edit)" - Fake Blood (2009)
"Mercury (Hervé Is in Disarray Remix)" - Bloc Party (2009)
"I'm Not Alone (Hervé's See You at the Festivals Remix)" - Calvin Harris (2009)
"The Count (aka Hervé) and Lily Face The Fear" - Lily Allen (2009)
Omen (Hervé's End of the World Remix) - The Prodigy (2009)
"I'm in the House (Hervé's Burning Down the House Remix)" - Steve Aoki (feat. Zuper Blahq) (2010)
"Get Involved 2011" (Adam F & Herve's Stadium Kaos Remix) - Ginuwine (feat. Timbaland & Missy Elliott) (2011)
"Louder (Hervé Remix)" - DJ Fresh (feat. Sian Evans) (2011)
"Climax (Hervé Remix)" - Usher (2012)
"Countdown (Hervé Remix)" - Beyonce (2012)

References

External links

Hervé Essential Mix on BBC Radio 1, 2009

Living people
English electronic musicians
English DJs
English record producers
Remixers
1980 births
Electronic dance music DJs